A cigarette
 A type of nail (fastener) used for coffins

See also
 Nail in the Coffin, a 2019 EP by Aja and Shilow